Joseph Bryan Thompson (April 29, 1871 – September 18, 1919) was an American politician and a U.S. Representative from Oklahoma.

Biography
Born near Sherman, Texas, Thompson attended the public schools, and was graduated from Savoy College in Fannin County, Texas, in 1890. He studied law, and was admitted to the bar in 1892 and commenced practice in Purcell, Indian Territory. He moved to Ardmore, Indian Territory. Thompson married Mary Miller, and they raised two sons, James Miller Thompson and Joseph B. Thompson, Jr.

Career
Appointed commissioner for the United States court in 1893, Thompson returned to Purcell, Indian Territory. He resigned in 1897 and moved to Pauls Valley and resumed the practice of law. He served as delegate to the Democratic National Conventions in 1900, 1904, and 1908, and as member of the Democratic Territorial committee from 1896 to 1904. He was chairman of the Democratic State committee in 1906 and 1908, and served in the State senate from 1910 to 1914.

Thompson was elected as a Democrat to the 63rd Congress and to the three succeeding Congresses and served from March 4, 1913, until his death.

Death
On September 18, 1919, Thompson died of heart failure induced by Bright's disease while on a train near Martinsburg, West Virginia en route to his home at Pauls Valley, Oklahoma. He is interred at Mount Olivet Cemetery, Pauls Valley, Oklahoma.

See also
List of United States Congress members who died in office (1900–49)

References

External links

 
Oklahoma Historical Society

 Joseph B. Thompson, late a representative from Oklahoma, Memorial addresses delivered in the House of Representatives and Senate frontispiece 1921

1871 births
1919 deaths
People from Sherman, Texas
People from Pauls Valley, Oklahoma
Oklahoma lawyers
Democratic Party Oklahoma state senators
Democratic Party members of the United States House of Representatives from Oklahoma
19th-century American politicians
People from Ardmore, Oklahoma
19th-century American lawyers